Trần Triệu Quân (March 26, 1952 – January 12, 2010) was a Vietnamese-Canadian grandmaster of taekwondo and a professional engineer. He was president of one of the three International Taekwon-Do Federation groups from mid-2003 until his death. Trần held the rank of 9th dan black belt in taekwondo.

Trần was born on March 26, 1952, in Vietnam. He began his study of taekwondo when he was twelve years old. Trần attained black belt status by the age of 17, and was teaching taekwondo under his instructor, Kim Bong Sik. He emigrated  to Canada in 1970, studying mechanical engineering at Laval University and establishing the first taekwondo schools in eastern Canada.

Apart from his extensive taekwondo activities, Trần operated Norbati Consultants Trần & Associates, a consulting firm specializing in building standards and project management for the construction sector. In 1994, Trần was imprisoned in Vietnam after a one-million-dollar sale of cotton to a Vietnamese state company, which he had brokered, fell through. He spent three years in prison before being released.

Trần was promoted to 7th dan on July 1, 1990, 8th dan on December 3, 2000, and 9th dan on December 22, 2008. He was appointed President of one of the three ITF organizations on June 13, 2003.

Trần was in Port-au-Prince, Haiti, on business (ironically, working on improving building standards to withstand earthquakes and hurricanes), and was staying in the Hôtel Montana when it collapsed in a 7.0 magnitude earthquake on January 12, 2010. Upon Trần's disappearance, ITF Senior Vice-President and Grand Master Pablo Trajtenberg  was named Acting President of the ITF group that Trần had led. Trần's remains were found and his death was confirmed on February 12, 2010.

Trần was married to Nguyễn Thị Mỹ. They had two daughters and a son—Joliette, Cécilia, and Nicolas—all holders of black belts in taekwondo. Apart from his wife and children, Trần left behind a son-in-law, François Beaudin; grandchildren Jasmine and Sandrine; and brothers Trần Triệu Cung and Trần Triệu Lân.

See also
 List of taekwondo grandmasters

References

External links
  (Globe and Mail obituary)
  (biography)
  

 

1952 births
2010 deaths
Sportspeople from Hanoi
Canadian people of Vietnamese descent
Canadian sportspeople of Vietnamese descent
Sportspeople from Quebec City
Victims of the 2010 Haiti earthquake
Vietnamese male taekwondo practitioners
American taekwondo practitioners